was a Japanese politician who served as Prime Minister of Japan and President of the Liberal Democratic Party from 1982 to 1987. He was a member of the House of Representatives for more than 50 years. He was best known for pushing through the privatization of state-owned companies and pursuing a hawkish and pro-U.S. foreign policy.

Early life

Nakasone was born in Takasaki in Gunma, a prefecture northwest of Tokyo, on 27 May 1918. He was the second son of Nakasone Matsugoro II, a lumber dealer, and Nakamura Yuku. He had five siblings: an elder brother named Kichitaro, an elder sister named Shoko, a younger brother named Ryosuke and another younger brother and younger sister who both died in childhood. The Nakasone family had been of the samurai class during the Edo period, and claimed direct descent from the Minamoto clan through the famous Minamoto no Yoshimitsu and through his son Minamoto no Yoshikiyo (d. 1149). According to family records, Tsunayoshi (k. 1417), a vassal of the Takeda clan and a tenth-generation descendant of Yoshikiyo, took the name of Nakasone Juro and was killed at the Battle of Sagamigawa. His descendants became silk merchants and pawnbrokers. Nakasone's father, originally born Nakasone Kanichi, settled in Takasaki in 1912 and established a timber business and lumberyard which had success as a result of the post-First World War building boom.

Nakasone described his early childhood and youth as a happy one, and himself as a "quiet, easy-going child" nicknamed "Yat-chan". He attended a local primary school in Takasaki and was a poor student until the fourth grade, after which he excelled and was at the top of his class. He entered Shizuoka High School in 1935, where he excelled in history and literature, and learned to speak fluent French. In the autumn of 1938, Nakasone entered Tokyo Imperial University. During World War II, he was a commissioned officer and paymaster in the Imperial Japanese Navy. He was stationed at Balikpapan in East Kalimantan, Indonesia, to build an airfield when he was a lieutenant. He realized that the construction of the airfield had been stalled due to the prevalence of sexual crimes, gambling, and other problems among his men, so he gathered comfort women and organized  a brothel called comfort station as a solution. He managed to procure four Indonesian women, and a Navy report praised him for "mitigated the mood of the his troops". His decision to provide comfort women to his troops was replicated by thousands of Imperial Japanese Army and Navy officers across the Indo-Pacific both before and during World War II, as a matter of policy. From Nauru to Vietnam, from Burma to Timor, women were treated as the first reward of conquest." He later wrote of his return to Tokyo in August 1945 after Japan's surrender: "I stood vacantly amid the ruins of Tokyo, after discarding my officer's short sword and removing the epaulettes of my uniform. As I looked around me, I swore to resurrect my homeland from the ashes of defeat".

In 1947, he gave up a promising career in an elite government ministry to run for Parliament with the belief that in its postwar remorse, Japan was in danger of discarding its traditional values. He campaigned on a nationalist platform, arguing for an enlarged Self-Defence Force, to amend Article 9 of the Japanese Constitution (which outlawed war as a means to settling international disputes), and to revive Japanese patriotism, especially in reverence for the Emperor.  He entered the Diet of Japan as a member of the House of Representatives for the Democratic Party. "As a freshman lawmaker in 1951, he delivered a 28-page letter to General MacArthur criticising the occupation, a brazen move. The General angrily threw the letter in [the] bin, Yasuhiro was later told. This stand established [Yasuhiro Nakasone's] credentials as a right-wing politician." He gained brief notoriety in 1952 for blaming Emperor Hirohito for Japan's defeat in the war.  In 1955, at Nakasone's urging, the government granted the equivalent of $14,000,000 to the Agency for Industrial Science and Technology to begin nuclear power research. Nakasone rose through the LDP's ranks, becoming Minister of Science in 1959 under the government of Nobusuke Kishi, then Minister of Transport in 1967, Director General of the Japan Defense Agency from 1970 to 1971, Minister of International Trade and Industry in 1972 and Minister of Administration in 1981.

As the head of the Self-Defence Force, Nakasone argued for an increase in defence spending from less than 1% GDP to 3% of GDP. He was also in favour of Japan having tactical nuclear weapons. He was labelled "the weathervane" in 1972 because he switched his support from Takeo Fukuda to Kakuei Tanaka in the leadership election, ensuring Tanaka's victory. In turn, Tanaka would give his powerful support to Nakasone against Fukuda a decade later in the fight for the premiership.

Premiership
In 1982, Nakasone became prime minister. Along with Minister of Foreign Affairs Shintaro Abe, Nakasone improved Japanese relations with the USSR and the People's Republic of China. Nakasone was best known for his close relationship with U.S. President Ronald Reagan, popularly called the "Ron-Yasu" friendship. Nakasone sought a more equal relationship with the United States, and said: "President Reagan is the pitcher and I'm the catcher. When the pitcher gives the signs, I'll co-operate unsparingly, but if he doesn't sometimes follow the catcher's signs, the game can't be won". Nakasone said Japan would be "America's unsinkable aircraft carrier" in the Pacific and that Japan would "keep complete control of the four straits that go through to Japanese islands, to prevent the passage of Soviet submarines". He was attacked by political opponents as a reactionary and a "dangerous militarist". Nakasone responded by saying: "A nation must shed any sense of ignominy and move forward seeking glory". However his attempt to amend Article 9 failed.

In 1984, Nakasone visited China on the twelfth anniversary of Japan's diplomatic recognition of the People's Republic, for which the Chinese government arranged tours of China for 3,000 Japanese youths. On the trip, Nakasone's son was privately accompanied by the daughter of Hu Yaobang, the-then General Secretary of the Communist Party of China. After the event, Hu was criticised by other members of the Chinese Communist Party for the extravagance and warmth of the event. Nakasone also visited President Corazon Aquino in a series of talks between the Philippines and Japan during a special state visit from 1986 to 1987, to provide good economic and trade relations.

In economic affairs, Nakasone's most notable policy was his privatisation initiative, which led to the breakup of Japan National Railways into the modern Japan Railways Group (JR). This led to 80,000 redundancies, unheard of in Japan until that point. He also privatized Nippon Telegraph and Telephone Public Corporation and Japan Tobacco and Salt Public Corporation to create Nippon Telegraph and Telephone Corporation (NTT) and Japan Tobacco Inc. (JT). The privatization of the three public corporations reduced the number of employees and significantly improved ordinary income per employee, productivity, and sales. According to a report by Japan Institute for Labour Policy and Training, 20 years after the privatization of NTT and JT and 16 years after the privatization of JR, the number of employees was reduced to 35% for JT, 65% for NTT and 70% for JR. In addition, NTT, JT and JR increased their ordinary income by 8 times, 5.5 times and 3 times, respectively. The productivity of NTT, JT and JR increased 3 times, 2.5 times and 1.5 times, respectively. Sales at NTT and JR increased 2.2 times and 1.2 times, respectively. Nakasone wrote of his economic reforms:

I was carrying out a kind of "improvement" of Japan's structure. For 110 years, ever since the Meiji restoration, Japan had been striving to catch up with America and Britain. In the 1970s we did catch up. Beyond that point the [state's] regulations only stand in the way of the growth of the economy. If government officials have too much power, the private sector of the economy will not grow. We had to change the system.

For the first time in Japan's post-war history, bureaucrats lost their leading role. In 1985, Nakasone appointed the former Governor of the Bank of Japan, Haruo Maekawa, to head a commission on Japan's economic future. In 1986, the Commission recommended that Japan should grow not through exports (which were angering Japan's trading partners) but from within. Nakasone advised the Japanese public to purchase foreign imports; in a well-publicised shopping trip, he bought an American tennis racket, an Italian tie and a French shirt. He said: "Japan is like a mah-jong player who always wins. Sooner or later the other players will decide that they do not want to play with him". The Japanese public were skeptical but the Commission created a good impression abroad, especially in America, where the Under Secretary of State for Economic Affairs W. Allen Wallis called it a watershed in Japan's post-war economic policy.

Nakasone also became known for having a nationalist attitude and for wanting to stimulate ethnic pride amongst the Japanese. He was an adherent to the nihonjinron theory that claims Japan is incomparably different from the rest of the world. Influenced by Japanese philosopher Tetsuro Watsuji, Nakasone believed that Japan's "monsoon culture" inspired a special Japanese compassion, unlike the desert culture of the Middle East that produced the Judeo-Christian "An eye for an eye, a tooth for a tooth". In a speech in 1986, Nakasone said it was Japan's international mission to spread the monsoon culture abroad.

On 15 August 1985, the fortieth anniversary of Japan's surrender, Nakasone and his Cabinet visited the Yasukuni Shrine, where Japan's war casualties - including convicted war criminals - were buried, in full mourning dress. This had great symbolic significance as he visited the shrine in his official capacity, intending to reassert the Japanese government's respect for the spirits of the ancestors killed in battle, including those who died in World War II. This turned out however to be a controversial move which was heavily criticised by the Chinese Government (including in its newspaper, People's Daily) and led to angry demonstrations in Beijing. It was also attacked by opponents at home for violating the Constitution's separation of religion and state. Nakasone defended his actions by saying, "The true defence of Japan ... becomes possible only through the combination of liberty-loving peoples who are equal to each other ... The manner is desired to be based on self-determination of the race". He also said, "It is considered progressive to criticise pre-war Japan for its faults and defects, but I firmly oppose such a notion. A nation is still a nation whether it wins or loses a war".

Nakasone also sought educational reform, setting up a commission. Its report recommended that "a spirit of patriotism" should be inculcated in children, along with respect for elders and authority. This was not fully implemented and came under attack from the teachers' trade union. The commission also recommended that the national anthem should be taught and that the Rising Sun Flag should also be raised during entrance and graduation ceremonies. History textbooks were also reformed. In 1986, Nakasone dismissed his Education Minister, Masayuki Fujio, after he justified Japan's annexation of Korea in 1910.

Nakasone aroused controversy in September 1986 when he claimed that Americans were, on average, less intelligent than Japanese because "the US has many immigrants, Puerto Ricans, Mexicans, and Blacks, who bring the average level down" and also said that "in America today there are still many Blacks who can't even read." He then clarified his comments, stating that he meant to congratulate the U.S. on its economic success despite the presence of "problematic" minorities.

In 1987, he was forced to resign after he attempted to introduce a value added tax to reduce the burden of direct taxes in a policy designed to cut the budget deficit.

Later political life

Nakasone was replaced by Noboru Takeshita in 1987, and was implicated, along with other LDP lawmakers, in the Recruit scandal that broke the following year.

Although he remained in the Diet for another decade and a half, his influence gradually waned. In 2003, despite a fight, Nakasone was not given a place on the LDP's electoral list as the party, by then led by Jun'ichirō Koizumi, introduced an age limit of 73 years for candidates in the proportional representation blocks, ending his career as a member of the Diet.

In 2010, "aware of his status as one of the few leaders revered across Japan's suddenly fractured political landscape" and the country's "most revered elder statesman", Nakasone launched a series of interviews to address the direction of prime minister Yukio Hatoyama's government. In a profile at that time, he saw Hatoyama's "inexperienced left-leaning" government as "challenging Japan's postwar political order and its close relationship with the United States". As well, the LDP was "crumbling into disarray" in the wake of Hatoyama's victory. In the profile, Nakasone described the moment "as a national opening on par with the wrenching social and political changes that followed defeat in the [world] war [and] praised the appearance of a strong second political party as a step toward true democracy". "Being knocked out of power is a good chance to study in the cram school of public opinion", he was quoted as saying of the LDP. He "faulted Mr. Hatoyama for giving Washington the impression that [Hatoyama] valued ties with China more than he did those with the United States. 'Because of the prime minister’s imprudent remarks, the current situation calls for Japan to make efforts to improve things,' he said. The [Japanese] relationship with the United States is different from that with China, he said, because 'it is built on a security alliance, and not just on the alliance, but on the shared values of liberal democracy, and on its shared ideals.'" And relative to another high-profile current source of friction between Japan and the United States, Nakasone said: "Problems like Okinawa [and the American military base there] can be solved by talking together."

Personal life and death
On 11 February 1945, Nakasone married Tsutako Nakasone (30 October 1921 – 7 November 2012). Nakasone's son, Hirofumi Nakasone, is also a member of the Diet; he has served as Minister of Education and as Minister of Foreign Affairs. He turned 100 on his birthday.

Nakasone died in Tokyo on 29 November 2019, at the age of 101 years and 186 days.

Honours

National honours 
 Order of the Chrysanthemum :
 Grand Cordon, 29 April 1997
 Collar, 29 November 2019 (posthumously)
  Golden Pheasant Award of the Scout Association of Japan (1986)
Junior First Rank (29 November 2019; posthumously)

Foreign honours 
:
 Grand Cross of the Order of the Aztec Eagle
:
 Grand Cross 1st Class of the Order of Merit of the Federal Republic of Germany
:
 Grand Collar (Raja) of the Order of Sikatuna
:
 Grand Cordon of the Order of the Nile
:
 Star of Mahaputera, 1st Class
:
 Grand Cross (Storkors) of the Order of Saint Olav
:
 Grand Cross of the Order of the Liberator General San Martín
:
 The Most Honourable Order of Seri Paduka Mahkota Brunei, First Class
:
 Grand Cross of the Order of Merit for Distinguished Service
:
 Grand Cross of the Order of the White Rose of Finland
:
 Order of Diplomatic Service Merit, 1st Class (Grand Gwanghwa Medal)
:
 Knight Grand Cordon of the Most Exalted Order of the White Elephant
:
 Grand Officier of the Légion d'honneur

See also

References

Citations

Sources 

 Robert Harvey, The Undefeated: The Rise, Fall and Rise of Greater Japan (London: Macmillan, 1994).
 Karel van Wolferen, The Enigma of Japanese Power: People and Politics in a Stateless Nation (New York: Vintage, 1990).
 The Making of the New Japan. Curzon Press. 6 March 2015.

External links

Further reading

Secondary sources 
 Hatta, Tatsuo. "The Nakasone-Takeshita tax reform: a critical evaluation". American Economic Review 82.2 (1992): 231–236. .
 Hebbert, Michael, and Norihiro Nakai. "Deregulation of Japanese planning in the Nakasone era". Town Planning Review 59.4 (1988): 383.

 Muramatsu, Michio. "In search of national identity: The politics and policies of the Nakasone administration". Journal of Japanese Studies 13.2 (1987): 307–342. .
 Pharr, Susan J. "Japan in 1985: The Nakasone Era Peaks". Asian Survey 26.1 (1986): 54–65. .
 Pyle, Kenneth B. "In pursuit of a grand design: Nakasone betwixt the past and the future". Journal of Japanese Studies 13.2 (1987): 243–270. .
 Hofmann, Reto. "The Conservative Imaginary: Moral Re-armament and the Internationalism of the Japanese Right, 1945–1962," Japan Forum, (2021) 33:1, 77-102, DOI:10.1080/09555803.2019.1646785
 Thayer, Nathaniel B. "Japan in 1984: the Nakasone Era continues". Asian Survey 25.1 (1985): 51–64. .

Primary sources
 Carter, Jimmy, and Yasuhiro Nakasone. "Ensuring alliance in an unsure world: The strengthening of US‐Japan partnership in the 1990s". Washington Quarterly 15.1 (1992): 43–56.
 Nakasone, Yasuhiro. "Reflections on Japan's past". Asia‐Pacific Review 2.2 (1995): 53–71.
 Nakasone, Yasuhiro. "Pitchers and catchers: Politicians, bureaucrats, and policy‐making in Japan". Asia‐Pacific Review 2.1 (1995): 5–14.
 Nakasone, Yasuhiro. "Japan and the China Problem: A Liberal-Democratic View". Japan Quarterly 8.3 (1961): 266–273.

Offices and distinctions

1918 births
2019 deaths
20th-century prime ministers of Japan
Democratic Party (Japan, 1947) politicians
Grand Crosses 1st class of the Order of Merit of the Federal Republic of Germany
Grand Officiers of the Légion d'honneur
Imperial Japanese Navy officers
Japanese centenarians
Men centenarians
Japanese defense ministers
Imperial Japanese Navy personnel of World War II
Japanese Shintoists
Liberal Democratic Party (Japan) politicians
Members of the House of Representatives (Japan)
People from Takasaki, Gunma
University of Tokyo alumni
Politicians from Gunma Prefecture
Japanese anti-communists